David Sparenberg (born May 28, 1959 in Talbotville, Ontario, Canada) is a former professional American football guard. He played his college football at the University of Western Ontario and was drafted in the fourth round of the 1984 CFL Draft by the Saskatchewan Roughriders. He played two seasons in the Canadian Football League for the Edmonton Eskimos. In 1987, he was signed by the Cleveland Browns as a replacement player during the 1987 NFL strike. He played in one game for the Browns before he sustained an injury where he was placed on injured reserve for the remainder of the season.

External links
Pro-Football reference

1959 births
Living people
People from Elgin County
Sportspeople from Ontario
Players of Canadian football from Ontario
Canadian players of American football
American football offensive guards
Cleveland Browns players
Western Mustangs football players